Arnbjørn Theodor Hansen (born 27 February 1986 in Eiði) is a Faroese football striker who plays for EB/Streymur in the Faroe Islands Premier League. He has also played for the Faroe Islands national team from 2006 to 2014. As of 20 November 2020 he has played 288 matches and scored 155 goals in the Faroe Islands Premier League

Career
Arnbjørn Theodor Hansen has some good skills in handball and football. Through his younger years he played with HB and EB/Streymur. When Arnbjørn was at HB, he was 12 years old. He moved to EB/Streymur after his short spell at HB and it was there his football career really started. 
He had trials at Danish club Odense BK, but was not offered a contract with the Danish Superliga team. In 2008 Arnbjørn Hansen scored 20 goals in the Faroe Islands Premier League, the top Faroese division, for EB/Streymur. In 2006, he won the title "Best young player of the year". He was chosen as player of the year 2008. Hansen won the Faroese Golden Boot 2008 for being the top scorer in the top Faroese division, Vodafonedeildin. He scored 20 goals, which was 5 goals more than number two on the top scoring list, Andrew av Fløtum from HB Tórshavn, who scored 15. He also won the golden boot in 2010 together with Christian Høgni Jacobsen from NSÍ; they scored 22 goals each.

International goals
Scores and results list Faroe Islands' goal tally first.

Honours
 Faroese Premier League: 2008 and 2012
 Faroese Premier League Runner-up: 2006, 2007, 2009, 2010 and 2011

Individual
 Faroe Islands Player of the Year: 2008
 Effodeildin Team of the Season: 2012

References

 Soccerandequipment.com, Player of the year 2008 Faroe Islands.

External links
 Arnbjørn Hansen on FaroeSoccer.com
 

1986 births
Living people
Faroese footballers
Faroe Islands international footballers
EB/Streymur players
Faroe Islands under-21 international footballers
Association football forwards
Faroe Islands youth international footballers
People from Eiði Municipality